Pizzo Gallina is a  mountain in the Lepontine Alps of Switzerland, overlooking the Nufenen Pass.

Administratively, the summit is located on the border between the municipality of Obergoms, to the north-west and in the canton of Valais, and the municipality of Bedretto, to the south-east and in the canton of Ticino.

References

External links
Pizzo Gallina on Summitpost
Pizzo Gallina on Hikr

Mountains of the Alps
Alpine three-thousanders
Mountains of Valais
Mountains of Ticino
Ticino–Valais border
Lepontine Alps
Mountains of Switzerland